Gran Coclé is an archaeological culture area of the so-called Intermediate Area in pre-Columbian Central America. The area largely coincides with the modern-day Panamanian province of Coclé, and consisted of a number of identifiable native cultures.  Archaeologists have loosely designated these cultures by pottery style.  The poorly studied La Mula period ranged from 150 BC to AD 300.  It was followed by the Tonosi period, from AD 300 to AD 550, and by the Cubita period, from AD 550 to AD 700.  A unified Native American culture appears to have flourished in this area from approximately 1200 BC until the 16th century.

Archaeologists working at intervals since the 1920s have uncovered ruins and burials which contain striking artifacts.  These include worked gold and other metals, carved bone, shell and whale ivory, textiles, jewelry with semi-precious stones and pottery. Coclé gold work was traded throughout the region, and has been found as far away as Chichen Itza in Yucatán. The large collection of Coclé pre-historic pottery is notable for strong structural design and the use of fish, bird, animal and human figures as decoration.

In the 1920s, at least one major archaeological site, Sitio Conte, was so badly damaged by an unprofessional excavator that much of its history is lost.  In the 1930s and 1940, Sitio Conte was extensively excavated by Harvard archaeologist Samuel K. Lothrop and University of Pennsylvania archaeologist J. Alden Mason, each of whom published their findings.  A modest museum on that site displays artifacts and site history.  A second site, El Caño, was more professionally explored and provides valuable information about the Coclé culture.  A portion of Coclé's archaeological sites have been designated as the Gran Coclé Culture Area.  Harvard University's Peabody Museum of Archaeology and Ethnology, Cambridge, Massachusetts, published two major works, in 1937 and 1942 respectively, on later excavations in Coclé.

References
 Lothrop, Samuel Kirland.  Pre-Columbian Designs from Panama -Illustrations of Coclé Pottery.  Dover Publications, Toronto, Canada, 1976.  .

Further reading
Labbé, Armand J.: Guardians of the Life Stream: Shamans, Art and Power in Prehispanic Central Panama. Univ of Washington Press (February 1995). . Many color photos.
Cooke, Richard G.: The Gilcrease Collection and Gran Coclé 2011. Well-written, interesting and includes many color photos, identifying pottery styles. Extensive bibliography.

External links 
 Coclé Archaeological Sites
 Pre-Columbian Gold artifacts from the Cocle Province
 Pre-Columbian Jade artifacts from the Cocle Province
 Pre-Columbian Stone artifacts from Cocle
 Pre-Columbian Pottery from Cocle

History of Panama
Coclé Province
Indigenous ceramics of the Americas
Archaeology of the Americas